Ronald Colman began his career as an actor on the stage following his service in the British Army during World War I.  He made his film debut in an unreleased two-reeler titled The Live Wire (1917).  After achieving minor success on the stage and in British films, he immigrated to the United States in 1920.  There he continued his acting with only moderate success until he was offered the lead opposite Lillian Gish in The White Sister (1923). The film's popularity and critical acclaim led to Colman becoming a major star and also a romantic idol of the silent cinema.  As a contract player for Samuel Goldwyn, Colman was cast (frequently on loan-out) as leading man to many of the top actress as the silent era.  In five of his silents he formed a romantic team with Hungarian actress Vilma Bánky.

Colman made a successful transition to sound with his first talking feature, Bulldog Drummond (1929), followed by Raffles (1930) and The Unholy Garden (1931). After leaving Goldwyn in 1933, Colman continued his career as a free-lance performer and starred in a succession of critically acclaimed films (A Tale of Two Cities, Under Two Flags, Lost Horizon,  The Prisoner of Zenda, If I Were King, and The Light That Failed). In 1948 Colman won the Academy Award for Best Actor for his performance in A Double Life.

The filmography below lists all of Colman's films and is sub-divided into four sections: His British silent films, his American silents, his sound films, and a listing of short films in which he appeared as himself.  In addition to his film appearances, Colman's television credits are also listed.

Filmography

British silents

American silents

Sound films

Short film appearances as himself

Television

References

Notes

Bibliography
 
 
 

Male actor filmographies
British filmographies